Hippolytus Anthony Kunnunkal, OFM, Cap was an Indian prelate of the Catholic Church. He was the first apostolic prefect and first bishop of the Catholic Diocese of Jammu-Srinagar.

Early life 
Kunnunkal was born on 14 March 1921 in the city of Alappuzha in the state of Kerala, India.

Priesthood 
Kunnunkal was ordained a Priest on 11 April 1951. He was a missionary priest belonging to Order of Friars Minor Capuchin.

Prefecture 
Kunnunkal was appointed Prefect Apostolic of Jammu and Kashmir on 11 November 1978.

Episcopate 
Kunnunkal was consecrated Bishop of Roman Catholic Diocese of Jammu–Srinagar on 29 June 1986. While bishop of Jammu Sringar, he started an initiative to translate the Bible into Kashmiri, which would be completed in 2011, after his death. He died on 9 August 2008.

References 

Christian clergy from Kerala
1921 births
2008 deaths
20th-century Roman Catholic bishops in India